Eyes of a Stranger may refer to:

Eyes of a Stranger (1970 film), a gay pornographic film starring Jack Wrangler
Eyes of a Stranger (1981 film), a horror film starring Jennifer Jason Leigh
Eyes of a Stranger, an alternate title for the film Acting on Impulse
Eyes of a Stranger (album), an album by The Deele, or the title song
"Eyes of a Stranger" (song), a song by Queensrÿche
"Eyes of a Stranger", a song by the Payolas from No Stranger to Danger
"Eyes of a Stranger", a song by Edwina Hayes
"Eyes of a Stranger", a song by Andy Summers on the album XYZ
Eyes of a Stranger, a book by Rachel Ann Nunes
In the Eyes of a Stranger, a 1992 television film starring Justine Bateman and Richard Dean Anderson